Hickory Creek is a  long 3rd order tributary to the Deep River in Guilford County, North Carolina.

Course
Hickory Creek rises at the south end of Greensboro, North Carolina in Guilford County and then takes a southerly course to join the Deep River about 2 miles southeast of Freeman Mill, North Carolina.

Watershed
Hickory Creek drains  of area, receives about 45.8 in/year of precipitation, and has a wetness index of 404.36 and is about 35% forested.

See also
List of rivers of North Carolina

References

Rivers of North Carolina
Rivers of Guilford County, North Carolina